Jorien Voorhuis (born 26 August 1984, in Hengelo) is a Dutch speedskater. Until season 2009/2012 she skated with the VPZ-team. Before season 2010/2011 Voorhuis changed to TVM. Her favorite distances are 1500 and 3000 meters.

Skating career

Early career
Her international breakthrough happened when she reached the 7th place at the Junior World Championships speedskating 2003 at Kushiro (Japan). She got a 2nd place on the 1500 meters. A year later she became 8th at the Junior World championships speedskating 2004. In 2005, she won 3 medals, including a golden medal on the 5000 meters at the Winteruniversiade. At the Dutch championships allround 2006 in Utrecht she won the bronze medal.

Season 2007/08
For the first runs at the World Cup she only qualified for the 5000 meters. During the Dutch championships sprint 2008 in Thialf (Heerenveen) she won the bronze medal on the 1000 meters. In the final placing she was 6th. Even though this was not enough for a spot in the World Championships sprint, it did get her a ticket to the World Cup for the 1000 meters.

During the Worldcup in Baselga, Voorhuis was the only Dutch competitor and came in 4th on the 1500 meters.

At the World Cup final in Thialf (Heerenveen), she qualified for the World Championships long distances 2008 in Nagano. She came in 11th at the 1500 meters there.

Season 2008/09
Voorhuis was 6th at the Dutch championships long distances 2009 on the 3000 meters, which wasn't enough to qualify for the World Cups. But right before the first Worldcup match in Berlin, Lisette van der Geest broke her collarbone, which caused Jorien Voorhuis to take her place. In the meantime, she rose to the 35th place in the Adelskalendern.

In the Dutch championships allround 2009 she was 4th at the final placing after disqualification of Renate Groenewold. But because Groenewold had a ticket for the European championships, Voorhuis was selected as a reserve for this championship. At January 21, 2009 Voorhuis qualified for the World Championships allround 2009 in Hamar, by a skate-off, along with her teammate Tom Prinsen. She was the 2nd Dutch skater in a 5th place.

Season 2009/10
Voorhuis participated on the 1500 (15th) and 3000 meters (10th) at the Dutch championships long distances 2010. At the Dutch championships allround 2010 she came in 2nd, which led to her 7th place at the European championships allround 2010. In February she entered in the 5000 meters at the Olympics and came in 10th. She also took part in the team pursuit.

Season 2010/11
At the Dutch championships long distances 2010 Voorhuis skated 3 distances. On the 3000 meters she was 6th, at the 1500 meters she was 5th. But she didn't qualify for the World Cup 2010/2011 because of the protection over Margot Boer. At the 5000 meters it looked like she was going to win, but she was disqualified for crossing the line at the straight side. The KNSB selected her for the World Cup anyway. She also got to skate the 3000 meters, because Marrit Leenstra canceled.

Personal records

Source: SpeedskatingResults.com

Tournament summary 

Source: www.sskating.com

References

External links
 Official website Jorien Voorhuis
 Voorhuis at KNSB.nl
 Jorien Voorhuis at SpeedSkatingStats.com
 Jorien Voorhuis' results at SchaatsStatistieken.nl (Dutch)
 PR's of Voorhuis at Jakub Majerski's Speedskating Database

1984 births
Living people
Dutch female speed skaters
Speed skaters at the 2010 Winter Olympics
Olympic speed skaters of the Netherlands
Universiade medalists in speed skating
Sportspeople from Hengelo
World Single Distances Speed Skating Championships medalists
Universiade bronze medalists for the Netherlands
Competitors at the 2005 Winter Universiade
21st-century Dutch women
20th-century Dutch women